"Boro Boro" is a debut single by Iranian–Swedish singer Arash, which was released in 2004 by Warner Music. The song has peaked at number 1 on the Swedish singles chart.

Track listing

Charts

Weekly charts

Year-end charts

Certifications

Ich bin weg (Boro Boro) 

On 24 September 2021 single "Ich bin weg (Boro Boro)" by German rapper Samra and German musician Topic42 featuring Arash was released by Cataleya Edition.

Track listing

Charts

Tora Tora (Boro Boro) 

On 9 June 2022 single "Tora Tora (Boro Boro)" by Greek singer Giorgos Mazonakis & Arash was released by Minos EMI.

Charts

References

External links
 

2004 songs
Arash (singer) songs
Persian-language songs
2004 debut singles
Number-one singles in Sweden
Warner Music Group singles
Song articles with missing songwriters
Songs written by Robert Uhlmann (composer)
Songs written by Arash (singer)